Brachygasterina muisca is a species of fly in the genus Brachygasterina of the subfamily Muscinae, described in 2012 by Soares and De Carvalho.

Etymology 
Brachygasterina muisca is named after the Muisca, who inhabited the central highlands of present-day Colombia where the fly has been found.

See also 

List of flora and fauna named after the Muisca

References

Bibliography 
 

Muscidae
Diptera of South America
Endemic fauna of Colombia
Arthropods of Colombia
Altiplano Cundiboyacense
Muisca
Insects described in 2012